UKSW may refer to:
 Cardinal Stefan Wyszyński University (UKSW) in Warsaw, Poland
 Satya Wacana Christian University (UKSW) in Salatiga, Central Java, Indonesia